Anne de Beauchamp may refer to:

Anne de Beauchamp, 15th Countess of Warwick, daughter of Henry de Beauchamp, 1st Duke of Warwick, suo jure Countess of Warwick
Anne Neville, 16th Countess of Warwick, née Anne de Beauchamp, aunt of the above, wife of Richard Neville, 16th Earl of Warwick